Stuttgart Ballet is a leading German ballet company. Dating back to 1609, then the court ballet of the dukes of Württemberg, the modern company was founded by John Cranko and is known for full-length narrative ballets. The company received the Laurence Olivier Award for Outstanding Achievement in Dance in 1981.

History 
The Stuttgart Ballet evolved from the court ballet of the Duke of Württemberg, dating back to 1609. The modern company was founded and shaped from 1961 by the South African born British dancer John Cranko "into a group with an exciting and visually arresting style". He created full-length narrative ballets including Romeo and Juliet, Onegin and The Taming of the Shrew, John Neumeier created for the company Die Kameliendame and A Streetcar Named Desire. The first tour to the US in 1969 resulted in international fame.

Dancers who have emerged from the company became well-known choreographers, including Neumeier, William Forsythe, Foofwa d'Imobilité, Uwe Scholz, Jiří Kylián and Renato Zanella.

Cranko was succeeded by as director by Glen Tetley (1974–1976) and Marcia Haydée (1976–1996) and then Reid Anderson (1996-present). The choreologist Georgette Tsinguirides has recorded all major ballets by Cranko and Kenneth MacMillan in Benesh Movement Notation and has been teaching these works to several generations of ballet companies internationally.

The company received the Laurence Olivier Award for Outstanding Achievement in Dance in 1981.

More than 25 years James Tuggle was the principal conductor of the Stuttgart Ballet. From 2019 through 2021 Mikhail Agrest was principal conductor.

Notable people 

Mikhail Agrest
Alicia Amatriain
Reid Anderson
Elisa Badenes
Ray Barra
Bridget Breiner
Daniel Camargo
Richard Cragun
John Cranko
Foofwa d'Imobilité
William Forsythe
Marco Goecke
Marcia Haydée
Kang Sue-jin
Birgit Keil
Jiří Kylián
Nora Kimball
Vladimir Malakhov
Egon Madsen
Evan McKie
John Neumeier
Sonia Santiago
Uwe Scholz

Glen Tetley
Georgette Tsinguirides
Friedemann Vogel
Renato Zanella

See also 
List of productions of Swan Lake derived from its 1895 revival

References

External links
 

Ballet companies in Germany
1609 establishments in the Holy Roman Empire
Organisations based in Stuttgart
Stuttgart Ballet